AFL Japan is a league and governing body for Australian rules football in Japan. 
The Top League season runs from April to November, with a summer break during August. All teams including the University teams compete in the Top League. The most successful team has been the Tokyo Goannas, who have been premiers since the inaugural Top League season.  In 2007, the Osaka Dingoes joined the Top League. Since then the league has expanded with the addition of 3 new teams with the Nagoya Redbacks joining in 2009, the R246 Lions joining in 2012 (formerly known as the Tokyo Leopards) and just recently the Tokyo Bay Suns in 2013.

The Japan national Australian rules football team, the Japan Samurais,  competed in the triannual Australian Football International Cup in 2003, finishing 10th out of 11 competing countries, in 2005, finishing 7th out of 10 competing countries and 2008, finishing 8th out of 16 competing countries. In 2011, they finished 12th in division 1, beating Fiji and narrowing losing to Sweden along the way.
In addition, a combined team of Japanese and Expat players compete in the annual Asian Australian Football Championships as the Japan Goannas.  Also, every year, the University Samurais tour Australia in August.  

Their best and fairest player (from the 2005 International Cup) was Michito Sakaki. Sakaki, along with teammate Tsuyoshi Kase was later invited to join the Australian Football League/Australian Institute of Sport academy camp in Canberra and Sakaki played for the Essendon Football Club annual 16-a-side match against the Sydney Swans at the North Sydney Oval on 3 March 2005 in front of 9,654 spectators. Both have since moved to Australia.  Sakaki played in the semi-professional Ovens & Murray Football League and Kase in the amateur VAFA.  At the recent International Cup 2011, Ken Sato of the Komazawa Magpies was named in the International XVIII team.  
Also, through the support of the Box Hill North Football Club, a Japanese player receives a scholarship to train and play in Australia annually.

Top League

Current Leagues & Clubs
Top League
Tokyo Goannas Official Site
University Samurais
Eastern Hawks Official Site
Osaka Dingoes Official Site
Nagoya Redbacks Official Site
Tokyo Bay Suns Official Site
Komazawa University Magpies Official Site
Senshu University Power Official Site
R246 Lions Official Site

See also

Australian rules football in Japan
List of Australian rules football leagues outside Australia

References

External links

Australian rules football in Japan
Sports governing bodies in Japan
Jap

Sports organizations established in 2004